Istrian Socialdemocratic Forum is a regional left-wing political party in Istria County of Croatia.

It was founded by dissident faction of Istrian Democratic Assembly and firstly it was named Istrian Democratic Forum, led by Luciano Delbianco, former prefect of Istria County.

In the past, it has usually been allied with Social Democratic Party of Croatia, but is currently allied with a number of small leftist parties, such as the Left of Croatia.

Electoral history

Legislative

Sources
Istarski demokratski forum (IDF) 

1996 establishments in Croatia
Political parties established in 1996
Regionalist parties in Croatia
Social democratic parties in Croatia